The following is a list of Coccinellidae of Nepal, primarily based on Claudio Canepari and San Donato Milanese's "Coccinellidae (Coleoptera)
from the Nepal Himalayas", A.P. Kapur's "Coccinellidae of Nepal", "The Coccinellidae of the Third Mount Everest Expedition, 1924 (coleoptera)" and J. Poorani's 2004 "An Annotated Checklist of the Coccinellidae (Coleoptera) of the Indian Subregion" with some recent additions and a modernized classification.

Subfamily Sticholotidinae
Jauravia assamensis
Jauravia limbata
Jauravia quadrinotata
Serangium sp.
Sticholotis amator
Sticholotis duodecimmaculata
Sticholotis decempunctata
Sticholotis duodecimpunctata
Sticholotis nepalensis
Sticholotis kumatai
Sticholotis rufolimbata 
Ghanius schawalleri

Subfamily Scymninae
Pseudoscymnus funerarius
Pseudoscymnus luteoniger
Pseudoscymnus nepalicus
Pseudoscymnus ocelliferus
Pharoscymnus flexibilis
Scymnus nubilus
Scymnus sufflavus 
Scymnus trisulicus 
Scymnus tristigmaticus 
Scymnus (Pullus) mellinus
Scymnus (Pullus) besucheti 
Scymnus (Pullus) posticalis 
Scymnus (Pullus) nepalensis 
Scymnus (Pullus) bourdilloni
Scymnus (Pullus) victoris 
Scymnus (Pullus) hepaticus 
Scymnus (Pullus) godavariensis 
Scymnus (Pullus) janetscheki 
Scymnus (Pullus) sodalis
Scymnus (Pullus) rufoniger 
Scymnus (Pullus) schawalleri
Scymnus (Pullus) martensi 
Scymnus (Pullus) exilis 
Scymnus (Pullus) fruticis 
Scymnus (Pullus) lucicolus 
Scymnus (Pullus) pyrocheilus 
Scymnus (Pullus) kosianus
Scymnus (Pullus) suturaloides 
Scymnus (Neopullus) fuscatus 
Scymnus (Orthoscymnus) smetanai
Scymnus (Orthoscymnus) rhododendri
Pullus bourdilloni
Pullus testacecollis
Pullus hingstoni
Cryptogonus quadriguttatus
Cryptogonus trioblitus
Cryptogonus hingstoni 
Cryptogonus himalayensis
Cryptogonus orbiculus
Cryptogonus postmedialis
Cryptogonus ariasi
Cryptogonus bimaculatus 
Cryptogonus complexus
Cryptogonus nepalensis
Hyperaspis marginaloides

Subfamily Chilocorinae
Exochomus timurensis
Platynaspidius saundersi
Platynaspis ocellimaculata
Platynaspis nepalensis
Chilocorus circumdatus
Chilocorus hauseri
Chilocorus braeti
Chilocorus matsumurai
Chilocorus nigritus
Chilocorus politus
Chilocorus rubidus
Chilocorus bijugus
Priscibrumus uropygialis
Priscibrumus disjunctus
Brumoides lineatus
Brumoides suturalis
Lithophilus lindemannae

Subfamily Coccidulinae
Sumnius renardi
Sumnius tanhhoaensis
Sumnius hoangi
Sumnius vestita
Rodolia octoguttata
Rodolia sexnotata

Subfamily Coccinellinae

Adalia tetraspilota
Aiolocaria dodecaspilota
Aiolocaria hexaspilota
Alloneda dodecaspilota
Ballia gustavi
Bothrocalvia decemsignata
Bulaea nevilli
Calvia shiva
Calvia durgae
Calvia trilochana
Calvia pinaki
Calvia pasupati
Calvia quatuordecimguttata
Calvia sykesii
Calvia vulnerata
Calvia breiti
Cheilomenes sexmaculata
Coccinella magnopunctata
Coccinella nepalensis
Coccinella saucerottei
Coccinella lama
Coccinella luteopicta
Coccinella nigrovittata
Coccinella septempunctata
Coccinella transversalis
Coelophora biplagiata
Coelophora bissellata
Coelophora circumvelata
Coelophora saucia
Coelophora sexareata
Coelophora nitidicollis
Halyzia straminea
Halyzia sanscrita
Halyzia sanscrita
Halyzia straminea
Harmonia axyridis
Harmonia dimidiata
Harmonia eucharis
Hippodamia arctica
Hippodamia heydeni
Hippodamia variegata
Illeis bistigmosa
Illeis confusa
Micraspis vincta
Micraspis univittata
Oenopia signatella
Oenopia sexareata
Oenopia kirbyi
Oenopia sauzeti
Oenopia mimica
Oenopia smetanai 
Oenopia diabolica 
Oenopia billieti
Oenopia quadripunctata
Propylea dissecta
Propylea luteopustulata
Palaeoneda miniata
Synonycha grandis
Afidenta misera 
Afidentula himalayana 
Afidentula bisquadripunctata
Afidentula manderstjernae
Afissa congener
Afissa gibbera
Afissa hingstoni
Afissula sanscrita
Afissa bengalica
Afissa nepalensis
Afissa dumerili
Afissa hendecaspilota
Afissa mystica
Afissa nielamuensis
Afissa gorkhana
Afissa elvina
Afissa marginicollis
Afissa mysticoides
Afissula rana
Afissula macularis
Afissula parvula
Afissula kambaitana
Diekeana grayi
Henosepilachna decemmaculata
Henosepilachna hopeiana
Henosepilachna schawalleri  
Henosepilachna indica
Henosepilachna pusillanima
Henosepilachna sikkimica
Henosepilachna undecimspilota
Henosepilachna vigintioctopunctata
Henosepilachna vigintioctomaculata
Henosepilachna dodecastigma
Henosepilachna kathmanduensis
Henosepilachna ocellata
Henosepilachna laesicollis
Singhikalia ornata

See also
List of butterflies of Nepal
Odonata of Nepal
Cerambycidae of Nepal
Zygaenidae of Nepal
Sphingidae of Nepal
Wildlife of Nepal

References

Coccinellidae
Insects of Nepal
Nepal, Coccinellidae